DG Tauri B, near the T Tauri star DG Tauri, is a young stellar object located 450 light-years (140 parsecs) from Earth, within the Taurus constellation. Observations of DG Tauri B were first made in October, and later December 1995 at the 6 element Owens Valley millimeter wave array. Its most notable characteristics are its bipolar jets of molecular gas and dust emanating from either side of the object. Red-shifted carbon monoxide emissions extend out 6,000 AU to the northwest of the object from the undetermined source, and are symmetrically distributed about the jet, while blue-shifted CO emissions are confined to a region with a roughly 500 AU radius.

References 

Taurus (constellation)
Astronomical objects discovered in 1995
Pre-main-sequence stars
Tauri, DG